The Matsu Distillery is a distillery in Niujiao Village, Nangan Township, Lienchiang County, Taiwan.

History
The distillery was originally established in 1956 as Zhongxing Distillery. In 1969, it was renamed to Matsu Distillery. In 1992, the distillery acquired Tunnel 88 from Chunghwa Telecom.

Architecture
The distillery consists of the main distillery building and the Tunnel 88 for storage, which is located 150 meters away from the main distillery building.

Exhibition
The distillery features an exhibition room which exhibits several different Kaoliang liquors from different period, discontinued medical liquors. It also features tools and production processes for the production of the liquors, as well as the selling for various liquors.

See also
 Kinmen Kaoliang Liquor

References

Buildings and structures in Lienchiang County
Distilleries in Taiwan
Nangang Township
Tourist attractions in Lienchiang County